Fərəhli (also, Fakhraly, Farakhli, and Farakhly) is a village in the Qazakh Rayon of Azerbaijan.

References 

Populated places in Qazax District